Antony Audenshaw (born 6 September 1964) is an English actor and singer. Audenshaw appeared in the Channel 4 soap opera Brookside from 1994 to 1996). Then in 2000, he began portraying the role of Bob Hope on the ITV soap opera Emmerdale. For his portrayal of the role, he received a nomination for Most Popular Newcomer at the 7th National Television Awards.

Life and career
Audenshaw was born in Denton, Lancashire on 9 September 1964. In 1993, Audenshaw married wife Ruth, and the pair had two children together before her death in 2017. Audenshaw began both his acting and music careers on stage whilst performing songs and sketches that he had wrote, later taking part in amateur theatre productions. Whilst trying to make it as an actor, he had a job at Thorpe Park and slept in his car on the car park since he could not afford accommodation. Between 1994 and 1996, he played the recurring role of PC Ian Coban in the Channel 4 soap Brookside. His Emmerdale debut was in 1996, when he played the part of security guard Acky. He later appeared as Bob Hope in 2000 and he has been a cast member since. For his portrayal of the role, he received a nomination for Most Popular Newcomer at the 7th National Television Awards. In December 2006, he appeared as himself alongside other members of the Emmerdale cast on a celebrity version of the TV show Family Fortunes, and in 2009, he appeared in and won an episode of Celebrity Mastermind. His specialist subject was birds.

Audenshaw has completed numerous London Marathons, and in 2010, he broke the Guinness World Record for the fastest time set by a runner dressed as a baby, when he completed the London Marathon in 3 hours and 13 minutes. He ran the Robin Hood Marathon in Nottingham on Sunday 12 September 2010 in 3 hours 54 minutes and 29 seconds. Audenshaw often runs in fancy dress for the charity Leukaemia & Lymphoma Research. On 17 April 2011, Audenshaw ran the 2011 London Marathon in 3 hours and 18 minutes dressed as a fairy. He has presented a feature called Tony's Trials on the weekly running podcast Marathon Talk. Audenshaw is the lead singer of a band called White Van Man, who released "Viva Englandia" in support of England's 2010 World Cup campaign. Since his wife died from pancreatic cancer, Audenshaw raised £4100 for Pancreatic Cancer UK on Celebrity Catchphrase in March 2022.

Filmography

Awards and nominations

References

External links 
 

1964 births
21st-century English male singers
21st-century English singers
English male film actors
English male soap opera actors
English male stage actors
Living people
Male actors from Lancashire
People from Denton, Greater Manchester